USS R-5 (SS-82) was an R-class coastal and harbor defense submarine of the United States Navy.

Construction and commissioning
R-5′s keel was laid down on 16 October 1917 by the Fore River Shipbuilding Company, Quincy, Massachusetts. She was launched on 24 November 1918, sponsored by Miss Margaretta King, and commissioned on 15 April 1919.

Service history

1919–1932
After completion at the Boston Navy Yard, R-5 got underway on 28 April 1919 for New London, Connecticut, where she was assigned to Submarine Division 9 of the Atlantic Fleet. She headed south on 4 December for Norfolk, Virginia, and winter exercises with her division in the Gulf of Mexico from 21 January to 14 April 1920. R-5 later returned to Newport, Rhode Island, on 18 May for four months of summer training in New England waters. Then given hull classification symbol SS-82 (effective 17 July) she sailed 13 September for Norfolk and an overhaul that was completed in April 1921.

In January 1923 she was used in the filming of the Twentieth Century-Fox motion picture The Eleventh Hour, and engaged in war games with the battle fleet in the Gulf of Fonseca from 5 February to 6 April 1923.

She was transferred on 16 July along with Division 9 to Pearl Harbor where she was based for the next eight years engaged in training and operations with fleet units. R-5 made an endurance run to Midway Island in July and August 1924 and in December, during division exercises off Pearl Harbor, rammed  in the after battery room, causing extensive damage to both ships.

R-5 was transferred back to the Atlantic on 12 December 1930 with Divisions 9 and 14 transited the Panama Canal on 28 January 1931 and arrived at New London on 9 February. She was assigned to Division 4 on 1 April and acted as training ship for the Submarine School until sailing on 28 April 1932 for Philadelphia, Pennsylvania, where she decommissioned on 30 June 1932.

1940–1946
After recommissioning on 19 August 1940, R-5 reported to Division 42 at New London on 30 October. She sailed on 10 December for the submarine base at Coco Solo, Panama Canal Zone, where she was assigned patrol duty in the Bay of Panama until returning to New London on 31 October 1941. She underwent overhaul and in December relieved  on patrol along the Bermuda-New England shipping lanes. Through the U-boat offensives of 1942 she maintained those patrols, operating out of New London and Bermuda, and alternating them with anti-submarine training operations for destroyers and destroyer escorts. Twice during the first part of the year she made contact with U-boats and once, on 10 February, fired torpedoes, but none found its mark.

From 1943 into 1945, R-5 continued to rotate between New London and Bermuda. After the end of World War II, she was ordered to Portsmouth, New Hampshire, for inactivation, Arriving on 6 September, she decommissioned on 14 September and was struck from the Naval Vessel Register on 11 October 1945. On 22 August 1946, R-5 was sold for scrap to John J. Duane of Quincy, Massachusetts.

References

External links
 

United States R-class submarines
World War II submarines of the United States
Ships built in Quincy, Massachusetts
1918 ships